Star Science Fiction Stories No.3 is a science fiction short story collection, first published in 1955 by Ballantine Books. The third book in the anthology series, Star Science Fiction Stories, edited by Frederik Pohl.

Contents
"It's Such a Beautiful Day" by Isaac Asimov
"The Strawberry Window" by Ray Bradbury
"The Deep Range" by Arthur C. Clarke
"Alien" by Lester del Rey
"Foster, You're Dead!" by Philip K. Dick
"Whatever Happened to Corporal Cuckoo?" by Gerald Kersh
"Dance of the Dead" by Richard Matheson
"Any More at Home Like You?" by Chad Oliver
"The Devil on Salvation Bluff" by Jack Vance
"Guinevere for Everybody" by Jack Williamson

External links

Anthopology 101: The Pohl Stars by Bud Webster, at Galactic Central

1954 anthologies
Star Science Fiction Stories anthology series
American anthologies
Ballantine Books books